Michael Bhaskar is a British writer, researcher and publisher.

His first book, The Content Machine: Towards a Theory of Publishing from the Printing Press to the Digital Network  (Anthem Press, 2013), is an academic exploration of the past, present and future of the publishing industry.

His second book Curation: The power of selection in a world of excess (Piatkus/Little, Brown, 2016) is business-oriented non-fiction, an analysis of how to prosper when facing information overload. It looks at how the idea of curation moved from museums and art galleries to the Internet and business.

He is also co-founder of Canelo, a digital publisher.

References

External links
Michael Bhaskar Profile at Hachette (publisher)

English male writers
British book publishers (people)
Living people
Year of birth missing (living people)